"Up/Down" is a song by Australian recording artist Jessica Mauboy, taken from her debut studio album Been Waiting (2008). Written by Kwamé Holland and Frankie Storm, "Up/Down" was released as the fifth single from Been Waiting on 28 August 2009. It peaked at number 11 on the ARIA Singles Chart and was certified gold by the Australian Recording Industry Association (ARIA).

Music video
The music video for "Up/Down" was shot in Los Angeles on 17 August 2009. According to a Sony Music representative, the video "explores the two sides of Jessica...The 'down' side of things will feature Jessica preparing for her shows and being the natural girl she is, whereas the 'up' will feature the showgirl in Jessica on stage, displaying her coming of age and edginess, the sexy entertainer within."

Track listing

CD single
 Up/Down – 3:26
Digital download
 Up/Down – 3:26
 Up/Down (Nufirm Remix) – 3:56

Charts

Weekly charts

Year-end charts

Certification

Release history

References

2009 singles
Jessica Mauboy songs
Songs written by Kwamé
2008 songs
Sony Music Australia singles